Kim Goodman is a woman with the largest eyes in the world (0.47 inches). She holds the world record for the farthest eyeball protrusion. She lives in Chicago, Illinois. She discovered her eyeball popping talent one day when she was hit over the head. Her eyeballs popped out much further than usual and ever since that day she could pop them out on cue, as well as when she yawns.

She has appeared on the Late Show with David Letterman.

In 2004, Goodman was included by Guinness World Records in their 50th anniversary list of top ten "feats" of all time.

References

People from Chicago
Living people
Year of birth missing (living people)
Contortionists